Luzenac AP is a French football club based in the commune of Luzenac (650 inhabitants) (Ariège). It was founded in 1936. They play at the Stade Paul Fédou, which has a capacity of 1,600. The colours of the club are red and blue.

History
In the 2013–2014 season, the club competed in the Championnat National, the third highest level of French football. On 18 April 2014 the club clinched promotion to Ligue 2 for the 2014–15 season, in the hopes of becoming the smallest club to ever compete at the second level of French football.  However, the club was ruled to have an inadequate stadium, and so they were not allowed to compete in Ligue 2. They ended up being forced to release their first team players and to use their reserve team squad to play in the seventh tier for 2014-15.

Current squad
As of 28 December 2019. Note: The following players in this squad are either free agents or signed by other teams.

Honours
 Division 4 Group G championship : 1980
 CFA2 Group E championship : 2005
 Midi-Pyrénées DH championship : 1971, 1985, 2000
 CFA Group C championship : 2009

References

External links
  Official website

 
Association football clubs established in 1936
1936 establishments in France
Sport in Ariège (department)
Football clubs in Occitania (administrative region)